Pterolophia rufipennis is a species of beetle in the family Cerambycidae. It was described by Maurice Pic in 1923.

References

rufipennis
Beetles described in 1923